Burton Gilliam (born August 9, 1938) is an American actor. He is best known for memorable roles in several popular 1970s movies, such as Blazing Saddles and Paper Moon, as well as comedic cameos
in Back to the Future, Part III and Honeymoon in Vegas.

Biography

Career
Before acting, Gilliam was a member of the Coast Guard's boxing team, where he won 201 out of 217 fights. He remained in the boxing world for decades, working as a referee in California.

While working as a fireman for the city of Dallas, Gilliam appeared in the role of "Floyd", the desk clerk, in the film Paper Moon. He then went on to appear in such popular movies as Blazing Saddles and Back to the Future Part III. Performing in Blazing Saddles was difficult for him, since he played a despicable racist who repeatedly hurls racial insults (including "nigger") at the black characters, especially the hero, played by Cleavon Little. Gilliam was so uncomfortable with his use of that slur that he apologized to Little, who had to remind him that it simply was a word in the script and that the racial insults were treated unambiguously negatively since he was playing a villain. Gilliam was also embarrassed by being the main protagonist in the fart scene.

Gilliam also has had roles in movies such as Honeymoon in Vegas, Thunderbolt and Lightfoot, Farewell, My Lovely, Fletch, Gator, Telefon and The Terror Within II. His television appearances include Alice, Charlie's Angels, The A-Team, The Dukes of Hazzard and The Fall Guy, and he appeared as a regular on Evening Shade.

Personal life
Gilliam was born in Dallas, Texas. He lives with his wife, Susan, in Allen, Texas, just north of Dallas. He has two children and four grandchildren. His granddaughter Hollie Vise is an American former  world champion artistic gymnast. 

Gilliam graduated from Woodrow Wilson High School in 1956 and was inducted into the school's hall of fame in 2004. In 2018, he was the grand marshal of the Dallas St. Patrick's Day parade.

Filmography

Films

 Paper Moon (1973) - Floyd (Desk Clerk)
 Blazing Saddles (1974) - Lyle
 Thunderbolt and Lightfoot (1974) - Welder
 At Long Last Love (1975) - Man at Racetrack
 Farewell, My Lovely (1975) - Cowboy
 Hearts of the West (1975) - Lester
 The Night That Panicked America (1975) - Tex
 Gator (1976) - Smiley
 Another Man, Another Chance (1977) - Sheriff Murphy
 Telefon (1977) - Gas Station Attendant
 The Beasts Are on the Streets (1978) - Al Loring
 The Jericho Mile (1979) - Jimmy-Jack
 Foxfire Light (1982) - Deke
 Fletch (1985) - Bud
 Uphill All the Way (1986) - Corporal
 The Girl (1987)
 The Underachievers (1987) - Red
 Back to the Future Part III (1990) - Elmer H. Johnson, Colt Gun Salesman
 The Terror Within II (1991) - Dewitt
 Quake (1992) - Willie
 Honeymoon in Vegas (1992) - Roy Bacon, Elvis Impersonator
 The Getaway (1994) - Gollie
 Wild Bill (1995) - Lynch
 Born to Be Wild (1995) - Dwayne
 Soccer Dog: The Movie (1999) - The Mail Man
 The Journeyman (2001) - Silas Bishop
 Mi Amigo (2002) - Older Pal Grisham
 An Eye for Detail (2002) - Professor William Seymore
 Sweet Hideaway (2003) - Det. Dick Johnson
 88 Hits (2003) - Victor Bordeaux
 Shtickmen (2003) - Ray Sellers
 Drop Dead Sexy (2005) - Big Tex
 Killing Down (2006) - Turner
 Cake: A Wedding Story (2007) - Judge
 Fire from Below (2009) - Bubba
 Breaking the Press (2010)
 Shattered Dreams V (2012) Daddy
 Return to Vengeance (2012) - Leonard
 The Wisdom to Know the Difference (2014) - Jesse
 The Lucky Man (2017) - Pawn Broker's Dad

Television
 The Girl, the Gold Watch & Everything (1980) - Hoover Hess
 The Girl, the Gold Watch & Dynamite (1981) - Hoover Hess III
 North and South Book II (1986) - Cpl. Strock
 Dream West (1986) - Martineau
 Evening Shade (1990-1994) - Virgil
 The Love Bug (1997) - Mechanic Race Announcer

TV guest appearances
 The Waltons (1975) - J.D. Paulsen
 Charlie's Angels (1977) - Ulmer
 Alice (1976-1978) - Buford Baker / Jimmie Joe Castleberry
 Soap (1979) - Buck
 Young Maverick (1979) - Barbary Kid
 B. J. and the Bear (1979) - Lacy
 Flo (1980) - J.J. Castleberry
 The Dukes of Hazzard (1979-1982) - Heep / Tom Colt
 Knight Rider (1983) - Trucker Gene
 Gun Shy (1983) - Jeremiah Jones
 The A-Team (1983) - Sheriff Jeff Lewis
 The Fall Guy (1983) - Sheriff
 Hail to the Chief (1985) - Clovis Montgomery
 Mama's Family (1987) - Bud
 Weird Science (1995) - Snake
 Sliders (1999) - Stage Driver
 Walker, Texas Ranger (1999) - Frank

Video games
 Redneck Rampage (1996) - Leonard (voice)
 Redneck Rampage Rides Again (1998) - Leonard (voice)

References

External links

 Burton Gilliam at mobygames.com

1938 births
Living people
American male film actors
American male television actors
Male actors from Dallas
People from Allen, Texas